Boyan Dimitrov (born 10 June 1916, date of death unknown) was a Bulgarian alpine skier. He competed in the men's combined event at the 1936 Winter Olympics.

References

1916 births
Year of death missing
Bulgarian male alpine skiers
Olympic alpine skiers of Bulgaria
Alpine skiers at the 1936 Winter Olympics
Place of birth missing